Jay McCarrol is a Canadian musician, writer and actor, most noted as cocreator and costar with Matt Johnson of Nirvanna the Band the Show.

He is a three-time Canadian Screen Award nominee for his musical work, receiving nods for Best Original Music for a Program at the 1st Canadian Screen Awards in 2013 for I, Martin Short, Goes Home and at the 4th Canadian Screen Awards in 2016 for The Second City Project, and for Best Original Score at the 9th Canadian Screen Awards in 2021 for The Kid Detective.

As a writer he has received two CSA nominations for Best Writing in a Comedy Program or Series for Nirvanna the Band the Show, at the 6th Canadian Screen Awards in 2018 and at the 7th Canadian Screen Awards in 2019.

His other credits have included Johnson's theatrical films The Dirties, Operation Avalanche and BlackBerry.

References

External links

21st-century Canadian male actors
21st-century Canadian male musicians
21st-century Canadian male writers
21st-century Canadian screenwriters
Canadian male television actors
Canadian male film actors
Canadian male composers
Canadian film score composers
Canadian television writers
Canadian television producers
Canadian comedy writers
Living people
Year of birth missing (living people)